Tochonanga was a Tataviam village now located at the area of what is now Newhall, Santa Clarita, California, along the Santa Clara River. People baptized from the village were largely moved to Mission San Fernando Rey de España and referred to in mission records as Tochonabit. Current tribal president of the Fernandeño Tataviam Band of Mission Indians, Rudy Ortega Jr., is a descendant of the village.

History

Indigenous 
Tochonanga was likely an important ceremonial center for the Tataviam based on the many chieftly names that came from the village. The terms Mu, Nu, and Nuguit were leader titles from the village. Tochonanga was located to the north of the large village of Pasheeknga.

Spanish colonial period 

With the arrival of Spanish soldiers and missionaries in the region, several villagers who were born in the early 1700s were brought to and baptized at Mission San Fernando. This included captain of the village Seuyeuyeminasu, who was given the name Jose Maria by the Spanish after his baptism in 1799. He married Teuteu, who was also born at Tochonanga (around the year 1766) and who was renamed Tomasa after her baptism in 1800.

From 1797-1811, 50 people from the village were baptized at Mission San Fernando. The villagers joined a burgeoning native population at the mission, which peaked in 1819 at 1,080 people. However, by the time of secularization in 1833, although 1,367 native children were baptized at the mission, 965 had died in that same period (or over 70% of the children). Historian James Miller Guinn noted in 1907, that "it was not strange that the fearful death rate both of children and adults at the missions sometimes frightened the neophytes into running away."

Modern period 
The village has been identified as being in the Newhall area, although it is unknown when it ceased to exist or where precisely it was located. Descendants of the village continued to live in the area for many generations. Current president of the Fernandeño Tataviam Band of Mission Indians, Rudy Ortega Jr., is a descendant of the village. The Fernandeño Tataviam Band of Mission Indians continue to teach about their history and ties to the land.

See also 

 Achooykomenga
 Mapipinga
 Piru

References

External links 
Native Narratives: History of the Fernandeño Tataviam Band of Mission Indians
Former Native American populated places in California
History of Los Angeles County, California
California Mission Indians
Santa Susana Mountains